Radiodetermination-satellite service  is – according to Article 1.41 of the International Telecommunication Union's (ITU) Radio Regulations (RR) – defined as «A radiocommunication service for the purpose of radiodetermination involving the use of one or more space stations. This service may also include feeder links necessary for its own operation.»

See also

Classification
This radiocommunication service is classified in accordance with ITU Radio Regulations (article 1) as follows: 
Radiodetermination service (article 1.40) 
Radiodetermination-satellite service (article 1.41)
Radionavigation service (article 1.42)

Radiolocation service (article 1.48)

The below depicted satellites are carrier of space radio stations dedicated to the radiodetermination-satellite service

Frequency allocation
The allocation of radio frequencies is provided according to Article 5 of the ITU Radio Regulations (edition 2012).

In order to improve harmonisation in spectrum utilisation, the majority of service-allocations stipulated in this document were incorporated in national Tables of Frequency Allocations and Utilisations which is within the responsibility of the appropriate national administration. The allocation might be primary, secondary, exclusive, and shared.
primary allocation:  is indicated by writing in capital letters
secondary allocation: is indicated by small letters
exclusive or shared utilization: is within the responsibility of administrations

 Example of frequency allocation

References / sources 

 International Telecommunication Union (ITU)

Radiodetermination services ITU